Clementia Killewald OSB (born Elisabeth Killewald, 25 April 1954 – 2 July 2016) was a German Benedictine nun, at Eibingen Abbey: serving first as an organist, then by taking care of the elderly and sick, and finally from 2000 as the abbess. She introduced the life and work of Hildegard of Bingen, the convent's founder, during the 2012 ceremony when Pope Benedict XVI proclaimed Hildegard a Saint and a Doctor of the Church.

Life 
Born in Duisburg as the oldest of nine siblings, Elisabeth Killewald grew up in Dinslaken. She received the Abitur from the Lise-Meitner-Gymnasium in Geldern. She studied first church music and flute at the Hochschule für Musik Mainz. She joined the Benedictine Abbey St. Hildegard in Eibingen in 1976, assumed the religious name Clementia (kindness) and made her temporary vows on her 25th birthday, 25 April 1979.

At the abbey, she worked first as an organist and member of the Choralschola, then took care of the elderly and sick in the infirmary. In summer of 2000 she was chosen by the convent to succeed Edeltraud Forster as abbess. She was dedicated on 3 October 2000 by Bishop Franz Kamphaus.

As the abbess, she regularly led the annual procession on the feast of Hildegard on 17 September with her shrine carried through the streets. She lectured about Hildegard, for example at the Liborifest of the Diocese of Paderborn in the presence of Archbishop Hans-Josef Becker in 2010. When Hildegard was proclaimed a Doctor of the Church on 7 October 2012 by Pope Benedikt XVI, Mother Clementia introduced Hildegard's life and work on St. Peter's Square during the ceremony.

She resigned for health reasons on 27 May 2016, accepted by Albert Schmidt. She died in Rüdesheim am Rhein on 2 July 2016 after severe illness.

Publications 
Mother Clementia worked as an editor of the works by Hildegard of Bingen, in new translations from Latin, published by the Beuroner Kunstverlag: 
 Wisse die Wege. Works, vol. I, translated by Mechthild Heieck. 2010, .
 Ursprung und Behandlung der Krankheiten. Causae et Curae. Works, vol.
 Lieder Symphoniae. Works, vol. IV, translated by Barbara Stühlmeyer. 2012, .
 Heilsame Schöpfung – Die natürliche Wirkkraft der Natur. Physica. Works, vol. V, translated by Ortrun Riha. 2012, .
 Das Buch vom Wirken Gottes – Liber Divinorum Operum. Works, vol. VI, translated by Mechthild Heieck. 2012, .
 Briefe. Epistulae. Works, vol. VIII, 2012, .
 Barbara Stühlmeyer, Sabine Böhm: Tugenden und Laster. Wegweisung im Dialog mit Hildegard von Bingen, 2012, .
 Das Leben der heiligen Hildegard von Bingen. Vitae sanctae Hildegardis. Works, vol. III, translated by Monika Klaes-Hachmöller, with an introduction by Michael Embach. 2013, . 
 Das Buch der Lebensverdienste. Liber vitae meritorum. Works, vol. VII, translated by Sr. Maura Zatonyi OSB. 2014, .

Awards 
The composer Ludger Stühlmeyer dedicated his Quatre pièces pour Orgue:Prélude romantique, Caprice expressionique, Hymne impressionique, Fugue baroque in 2001 to her, "Äbtissin Clementia zugeeignet" (dedicated to Abbess Clementia). It was published by the Sonat-Verlag in 2013, ISMN 979-0-50235-058-1.

References

External links 
 Benedictine Abbey of St. Hildegard
 "Die Sehnsucht hat sich erfüllt" / Interview mit Mutter Clementia Killewald, Äbtissin von Sankt Hildegard in Rüdesheim-Eibingen (PDF, in German) interview on 20 May 2012 
 Äbtissin Clementia Killewald OSB am 7. Oktober 2012 in Rom / Heiligsprechung (in German) 7 October 2012 in Rome
 Stimmen für Hildegard und Disibodenberg Rhein-Zeitung October 2012
 Andrea Emmel met Sr. Clementia Kirche im SWR, on Sunday, 16 September 2012.

Benedictine abbesses
1954 births
2016 deaths
People from Duisburg
German Roman Catholic abbesses
Latin–German translators
German editors
German women editors
20th-century German Roman Catholic nuns
20th-century translators
Consecrated virgins
People from the Rheingau
21st-century German Roman Catholic nuns